Long's Bakery is a bakery specializing in donuts in the Haughville neighborhood of Indianapolis, Indiana, in the United States, with a second location in Southport, Indiana.

History
Long's was founded in 1951 in Haughville. A second location in Southport, Indiana, just south of Indianapolis, opened in 1987. 
Both locations open at 5:30 AM daily and are cash only. 

In 2020, Indianapolis rapper Tevin Studdard released a song called "Long's Bakery Music Video" during which he raps about eating Long's donuts. The video has had over 390,000 views on YouTube. That same year David Letterman received the Bill McGowan Leadership Award in Indianapolis. During the award event, he tossed Long's donuts into the audience.

Cuisine

The bakery specializes in donuts. Their most popular is a glazed yeast donut, in which up to 20 people will wait in line for on Saturday mornings. They also produce apple cinnamon frys, apple fritters, Long Johns, and cake donuts.

Reception
Long's has been named one of the best donut shops in the United States by Thrillist and one of the best eating establishments in Indianapolis by Eater. It's also consistently named one of the best donut shops in Indiana and Indianapolis by local media, including the Indianapolis Star. It has been called one of the "essential eats" of Indianapolis by Indianapolis Monthly.

The original location is situated just 1 miles east of the Indianapolis Motor Speedway. For decades it has been a popular establishment with both fans and participants at the Indianapolis 500.

See also
List of doughnut shops
List of attractions and events in Indianapolis

References

External links

1951 establishments in Indiana
Doughnut shops in the United States
Companies based in Indianapolis
Restaurants in Indianapolis